, originally known as the EWF Horns, were the main horn section for the band Earth, Wind & Fire. The horn section was composed of Don Myrick on saxophone, Louis "Lui Lui" Satterfield on trombone, Rahmlee Michael Davis on trumpet, and Michael Harris on trumpet.

The Phenix Horns are also known for their work with Phil Collins and the band Genesis. They have also performed with other artists, such as the Chi-Lites, Ramsey Lewis, Deniece Williams and the Emotions.

The horn section should not be confused with the Earth, Wind & Fire Horns which were established in 1987.

History

The Pharaohs
Don Myrick, Louis Satterfield, and Rahmlee Michael Davis recorded in the early 1970s with the formation the Pharaohs, from which two albums have been re-issued on CD: The Awakening, recorded in 1971, and a live album, In the Basement, recorded in 1972.

Formation
A young drummer by the name of Maurice White met trombonist and bassist Louis Satterfield while performing at Chicago's Chess Studios. At that time Satterfield was working at Chess as a musician, where he played on hit songs such as Fontella Bass's "Rescue Me." The duo later collaborated as part of a jazz group known as the Pharaohs. After leaving Chess to play in the Ramsey Lewis Trio, Maurice went on to start up a band known as Earth, Wind & Fire. He eventually expanded the band's sound to include a horn section called The Phenix Horns. Two of Satterfield's bandmates from the Pharaohs, saxophonist Don Myrick and trumpeter Rahmlee Michael Davis, joined the horn section, along with trumpeter Michael Harris.

It was Harris' unique control and precision in the instrument's upper register that helped define the section's sound. The group was less beholden to middle register three and four-part harmonies (the trademark of Chicago's Lee Loughnane, Walter Parazaider, and Jimmy Pankow), instead favoring a more staccato, rhythmic, borderline percussive approach similar to the sound being popularized by trumpeter/arranger Greg Adams in Tower Of Power (though notably excluding the contrapuntal baritone saxophone spits favored by Adams, obviously in deference to the three horn, sax-centric sound of James Brown). This sound was ideally suited for Maurice's increasingly dance-oriented songs. 1974's "Mighty Mighty" from Open Our Eyes provides an early example (as well as a rare glimpse of Andrew Woolfolk's considerable facility on the soprano saxophone, an instrument noted for being inherently difficult to play in tune). The culmination of this sound, however, is best exemplified by 1978's "September", which prominently features a fast-moving unison line played in three octaves (Satterfield in the lower octave, Myrick and Davis doubling in the middle octave, and Harris in the upper octave) - for Satterfield and Harris, the line is in a difficult part of their respective instruments' upper registers, and the extreme precision is a testimony to both players' virtuosity.

The section also developed a unique approach to ballads. Davis and Harris doubled on the fluegelhorn, an instrument with roughly the same range as the trumpet but with a considerably softer, warmer timbre (the flugel was a favorite texture of many jazz trumpeters, notably Clark Terry, Art Farmer and Freddie Hubbard). The softer palette created by the blend of the two fluegels with Myrick's tenor sax and Satterfield's trombone allowed the section to still play interesting countermelodies and staccato jabs (listen to the post-chorus instrumental breaks of "Reasons" for a prime example) without being obtrusive or overbearing.

Myrick was also developing a distinctive solo voice. Though Laws and later Andrew Woolfolk, Laws' replacement, were intended to play the featured instrumentalist role in the band's live shows, Myrick eventually won over some of those duties for himself. He was particularly adept on the alto saxophone, distinctly demonstrating the influence of soul-influenced bebop saxophonist Julian 'Cannonball' Adderley. His tour de force is the burning, passionate solo on the 1979 single "After The Love Has Gone".

1979 saw the arrival and almost immediate departure of trumpeter Elmer Brown, who you can hear playing lead trumpet in Rotterdam, Netherlands, and Budokan, Japan live concerts in 1979.

Collaboration with Phil Collins
In 1981, the foursome joined Genesis drummer Phil Collins and producer Hugh Padgham in the studio for the recording of Collins' debut solo album, Face Value. Five of the musically diverse album's 12 tracks featured horns, with a sixth (a rendition of the Beatles' "Tomorrow Never Knows") featuring electronically manipulated samples of the section. The group's (and in particular Harris') extreme precision was put to good use in up-tempo numbers like "Behind the Lines" and the mostly instrumental "Hand In Hand". Myrick's lyrical alto playing is featured prominently on "If Leaving Me Is Easy", as are Harris' and Davis' signature fluegelhorn lines. The section also joined Collins' band Genesis at Fisher Lane Farm Studios, in Surrey, England, on the song "No Reply at All" on their album Abacab, as well as on "Paperlate", a song from the band's EP 3×3 which was also included on the US release of the album Three Sides Live.

The foursome developed a strong kinship with Collins and elected to join him on tour and for the recording of subsequent albums, while still intermittently performing and recording with Earth, Wind & Fire. 1982's Hello, I Must Be Going! saw a feature instrumental piece, "The West Side," penned for Myrick by Collins. Early concert footage shows the section doing considerably more than playing their instruments. Prior to 1989 Collins did not use dedicated backing vocalists in his live band, relying instead on instrumentalists. While guitarist Daryl Stuermer and bassists Mo Foster and Leland Sklar sing sporadically, the horn section sings and plays percussion on virtually every song that does not feature horns. During the extended intro to "Hand In Hand", the foursome join Collins at the front of the stage for a vocal call and response. Harris also contributed a brief co-lead vocal on the closing number, a rendition of the Isley Brothers' "It's Alright". Additionally, Satterfield played baritone saxophone to brighten the section's sound for certain parts.

Following the 1985–86 tour, Michael Harris departed the group and was replaced by Harry Kim. The horn section saw a diminished role in the live show. Collins began employing backing vocalists and occasionally dedicated percussionists. Following the 1990 live album/video Serious Hits… Live! Don Myrick also departed, largely due to continued struggles with drug addiction. He was replaced by erstwhile EWF co-saxophonist Andrew Woolfolk. By the time of the recording of 1996's Dance into the Light, the Phenix Horns had dissolved. They were replaced by the Vine Street Horns, featuring Phenix Horns replacements Woolfolk and Harry Kim along with 2nd trumpet Daniel Fornero and trombonist Arturo Velasco.

In 2000, Collins sued two members of the Phenix Horns, Louis Satterfield and Rahmlee Davis, to recover overpayment of royalties over 6.5 years. Due to an accounting error, Satterfield and Davis had been paid a 0.5% royalty for their contributions to the Serious Hits... Live! album while Collins' management contended that the pair should have been paid only for their contributions on five tracks of the 15-track album. The court ruled in favor of Collins but awarded only half of the $384,000 he sought. Satterfield and Davis were not required to pay back any money already paid out, and the $192,000 damages were to be paid from future royalties.

Breakup of the group
Band leader Don Myrick was shot to death by a Santa Monica Police Department officer in the doorway of his home in 1993. Myrick is buried in the Inglewood Park Cemetery in Inglewood, Los Angeles, across the street from the Forum, former home of the LA Lakers. Louis Satterfield returned to performing until his death in September 2004.

Rahmlee Michael Davis ultimately resumed a career as a solo jazz artist and occasional sideman/session player. Kim and Woolfolk still do session work with Fornero and Velasco under the Vine Street Horns moniker. Ronnie Laws performs primarily as a solo jazz artist. Michael Harris has toured with the Al McKay All Stars, performing classic Earth, Wind & Fire hits.

References

Horns
African-American musical groups
American session musicians
American brass bands
American funk musical groups